U Sports women's volleyball is the highest level of amateur play of indoor volleyball in Canada and operates under the auspices of U Sports (formerly Canadian Interuniversity Sport). 41 teams from Canadian universities are divided into four athletic conferences, drawing from the four regional associations of U Sports: Canada West Universities Athletic Association (CW), Ontario University Athletics (OUA), Réseau du sport étudiant du Québec (RSEQ), and Atlantic University Sport (AUS). Following intra-conference playoffs, eight teams are selected to play in a national tournament to compete for the U Sports women's volleyball championship.

Brief history
Organized university volleyball was first played in Ontario in the 1947-48 school year between the Toronto Varsity Blues and the McMaster Marauders where the two teams finished tied for the championship title. Toronto would win the 1948-49 title in the following year. In the Western Canada Intercollegiate Athletic Union (WCIAU), the Saskatchewan Huskies were named the first champions in Western Canada for the 1949-50 season. In 1950-51, volleyball was admitted as a sport into the Women’s Intercollegiate Athletic Union (WIAU) with Toronto, McMaster, Western, and OAC becoming the first four programs to compete in an Ontario league. For the 1952-93 season, McGill and Queen's joined competition in the WIAU. The Atlantic Intercollegiate Athletic Association (AIAA) began awarding championships for volleyball for the 1959-60 season which was won by the UNB Reds.

In 1969, the Canadian Women’s Interuniversity Athletic Union (CWIAU) was formed to provide a national governing body for women's varsity sport in Canada. In December 1969, the WCIAU proposed by that national championships should be established, which was accepted by the CWIAU. Because this was accepted in the middle of the school year, an unofficial national championship was held at the University of Waterloo and won by the Calgary Dinos in the spring of 1970. The first official championship was awarded following the 1970-71 season and was won by the Manitoba Bisonettes over the Toronto Varsity Blues in a match that was decided in four sets.

Beginning with the 1972-73 season, the Manitoba Bisons, Winnipeg Wesmen, and Regina Cougars played in the separate Great Plains Athletic Association (later renamed Great Plains Athletic Conference (GPAC)) while the Saskatchewan Huskies and teams from Alberta and British Columbia played in the Canada West Universities Athletic Association (CWUAA). The GPAC and CWUAA combined back into one conference starting in the 2001-02 season. The 2020 championship tournament and the entire 2020–21 season were cancelled due to the COVID-19 pandemic.

Season structure

Exhibition season
To prepare for the season, teams will typically play a series of exhibition games against conference and non-conference opponents. These games are usually played in September and/or October before the regular season and in December and/or January during the holiday break.

Regular season
As of the 2022-23 season, the RSEQ begin their season first, on the second Friday of October. The Canada West conference begins play one week later and the AUS schedule begins on the fourth Friday of October. The OUA begin their season on the first weekend of November. All regular season games are in-conference and the schedule ends in approximately mid-February. 

The AUS conference features six teams that play four games against each opponent for a total of 20 regular season games. In the RSEQ, seven teams play 18 conference games for a total of three games against each opponent. In Canada West, there are 14 teams in one conference that play against 12 other opponents resulting in 24 total games played. The OUA also features 14 teams in one conference after previously having teams split in an east and west division. OUA teams play two games against 10 different opponents, leaving three teams as non-combatants for each team's schedule. For the OUA and Canada West conferences, teams will usually play the same opponent twice in one weekend for ease of travel and scheduling.

Following the conclusion of the regular season, the Mary Lyons Award is awarded annually to the Player of the Year in U Sports women's volleyball. The Mark Tennant Award is given to the Rookie of the Year and the Thérèse Quigley Award is given to the best well-rounded student (volleyball, academics and community involvement). An award was also given for the Libero of the Year, but it was discontinued after the 2014-15 season.

Playoffs
After the regular season, playoff games and series are held between the top teams in each conference to determine conference champions. In the AUS and RSEQ conferences, the top four teams qualify for the playoffs and play a best-of-three series including in the conference championship. In Canada West, the top eight teams qualify for the playoffs and play best-of-three series in playoff brackets in the quarterfinals. The winners of these series play in best-of-three semifinals until two teams remain where they play in a single elimination conference championship game.

The OUA is the only conference that features a single elimination format in all playoff games. Teams are seeded one through eight and advance to the semi-finals in a bracket format with the higher-seeded team hosting each game. The highest-seeded remaining team hosts the conference championship, the Quigley Cup.

National championship

The U Sports women's volleyball championship was officially established in 1971 following the organization of the Canadian Women’s Interuniversity Athletic Union (CWIAU). A predetermined host university stages the eight-team tournament over three days and finals games are played on the last day to award gold, silver, and bronze medals. The host team is automatically qualified for the tournament, as are each of the conference champions. Three other teams are entered based on the strength of their conferences and their post-season finishes. The UBC Thunderbirds have won the most championships with 12 gold medals won, followed by the seven titles won by each of the Alberta Pandas, Manitoba Bisons, and Winnipeg Wesmen. The national championship has historically been dominated by the Canada West conference with those teams winning 42 of the 51 championship matches as of the 2022-23 season. The 2020 and 2021 championship tournaments were cancelled due to the COVID-19 pandemic.

Teams

Membership
There were 39 teams that had participated in the 2019–20 Women's volleyball season. Recently, St. Francis Xavier and Cape Breton previously had programs is the AUS conference, but they were cut due to budgetary reasons in 2013 and 2015, respectively. On the opposite side, the Canada West conference has seen a growth in team membership, adding the UBCO Heat in 2011-12, Mount Royal Cougars in 2012-13, MacEwan Griffins in 2014-15, and the UFV Cascades in 2020-21. The UQTR Patriotes are playing in the RSEQ Division 1 as of the 2021-22 season after playing the conference's Division 2. 41 teams competed in the 2022-23 season.

Canada West

Note: Conference titles won by teams in the Great Plains Athletic Conference (1972-73 season to 2000-01 season) are not included in the above table due to lack of information on this conference.

Ontario University Athletics

Réseau du sport étudiant du Québec

Note: The Ottawa Gee-Gees moved from the OUA to the RSEQ starting with the 2016-17 season.

Atlantic University Sport

References

External links
 

National volleyball leagues
Volleyball in Canada
U Sports volleyball